The Monsoon continental climate, also known as Manchurian climate, is a continental climate sub-type. It is a monsoon climate with large thermal range. It is located mainly in East Asia, Korea and Manchuria. Its dry season happens during the winter ("Dw" meaning "Dry Winter").

Sub-types
 Hot summer Manchurian climate, classified as a Hot summer continental climate (Dwa) under the Köppen classification: Mean temperature is above to 0 °C, but under to 10 °C. Precipitations about of 500 mm. This climate is located in Northeast China and Korean Peninsula.
 Warm summer or hemiboreal Manchurian climate, classified as a Warm summer continental or hemiboreal climate (Dwb) under the Köppen classification: Northeast of China and North Dakota.
 Monsoon subpolar, classified as a Subarctic or boreal climate (Dwc) under the Köppen classification: Zones of China, northern Mongolia and southern Siberia. Also in parts of Canada and Alaska.
 Monsoon subpolar with severe winters, classified as a Subarctic or boreal climate with severe winters (Dwd) under the Köppen classification: Extreme climate in small zones of Siberia.

See also
 Continental climate
 Humid continental climate
 Continental mediterranean climate
 Köppen climate classification

References

Climate and weather classification systems
Climate of Asia